The Superstars is the third album by the Dutch soundalike studio group Stars on 45, released on the CNR Records label in The Netherlands in March 1982. In the US, the album was retitled Stars On Long Play III, released on Radio Records and credited to 'Stars On'. In the UK, Ireland, Australia and New Zealand, the album was instead titled Stars Medley, again credited to Starsound and released by CBS Records. Just like the first Stars on 45 album The Superstars was also issued in the Soviet Union and large parts of the Eastern Bloc by the state-owned label Melodiya, credited to Stars on 45 but released under the title Discotheque Stars 2.

The fourth Stars On 45 single released in both Europe and the U.S. was "Stars on Stevie", paying tribute to Stevie Wonder and including a selection of his best-known songs, ranging from his breakthrough single "Fingertips" (released in 1963 and credited to Little Stevie Wonder) to his then most recent US hit "Master Blaster (Jammin)". The "Stars On Stevie" medley - in the UK somewhat confusingly released by CBS as Starsound: "Stars Medley", the very same title as the album - became Stars On 45's fourth UK Top 20 hit, peaking at #14 in February 1982. In the US, where it was given a third title, "Stars On 45 III: In Tribute To Stevie Wonder", it reached #28 on Billboard'''s Hot 100 chart.

The extended 12" mix of "Stars On Stevie" was included on Stars On 45's third full-length release The Superstars, where it was the opening track on Side B, followed by an also-extended version of the single's B-side, "It's Not A Wonder, It's A Miracle", written by the producer Jaap Eggermont and the musical arranger Martin Duiser.

For the A-side of the album, Eggermont returned to the concept of the first Stars On 45 LP by again creating a sixteen-minute side-long medley, this time dedicated to The Greatest Rock 'n Roll Band in the World, The Rolling Stones. The 25 track medley charted the band's then 17-year-long career, from their 1965 breakthrough with "(I Can't Get No) Satisfaction" via classic hits like "Ruby Tuesday", "Sympathy For The Devil", "Miss You", "Under My Thumb" and "Honky Tonk Women" all the way to the 1980 songs "Emotional Rescue" and "Start Me Up", a UK and US Top Ten hit in August 1981. "The Greatest Rock 'n Roll Band In The World" single did not do as well on the charts however; while it became another Top 20 hit in the Netherlands and a few other European countries it failed to chart in both the UK and the US and The Superstars album itself met with the same fate, only reaching #94 on the UK albums chart and failing to register on Billboard's Top 200 chart in the US.

Consequently, for the following album project, the producer Jaap Eggermont made a radical change of the Stars On 45 concept by launching the spin-off group The Star Sisters, mainly covering material made famous by The Andrews Sisters and other stars from the 1940s, 1950s and early 1960s - and without the Stars On 45 disco beat and its characteristic handclaps. The Star Sisters released three albums and a series of singles between 1983 and 1987 whose commercial success was limited to continental Europe in general and the Benelux countries in particular.

The Superstars/Stars On Longplay III/Stars Medley album in its entirety and in its original form remains unreleased on CD.

Track listing

Side A
"The Greatest Rock 'n Roll Band In The World" - 15:59All tracks written by Mick Jagger and Keith Richards unless otherwise noted 
 "The Stars Will Never Stop" (Eggermont, Duiser)
 "Sympathy for the Devil" 
 "Miss You" 
 "As Tears Go By" (Jagger, Richards, Oldham)
 "Brown Sugar" 
 "Jumpin' Jack Flash" 
 "Take It or Leave It" 
 "Under My Thumb" 
 "Honky Tonk Women" 
 "Lady Jane" 
 "(I Can't Get No) Satisfaction" 
 "Get off of My Cloud" 
 "Stars On" Jingle (Eggermont, Duiser) 
 "Under the Boardwalk" (Young, Resnick)
 "Out of Time" 
 "Gimme Shelter" 
 "Let's Spend the Night Together" 
 "Tell Me (You're Coming Back)" 
 "We Love You" 
 "Play with Fire" (Nanker Phelge)
 "It's Only Rock 'n Roll (But I Like It)" 
 "Ruby Tuesday" 
 "Star Star" 
 "Emotional Rescue" 
 "She's a Rainbow" 
 "Start Me Up" 
 "Angie"

Side B
1. "Stars on Stevie" - 7:42All tracks written by Stevie Wonder unless otherwise noted''
 "Uptight (Everything's Alright)" (Moy, Cosby, Wonder) 
 "My Chérie Amour" 
 "Yester-Me, Yester-You, Yesterday" (Miller, Wells) 
 "Master Blaster (Jammin)" 
 "You Are the Sunshine of My Life" 
 "Isn't She Lovely" 
 "Stars On" Jingle (Eggermont, Duiser) 
 "Sir Duke" 
 "I Wish" 
 "I Was Made to Love Her" (Wonder, Hardaway, Moy, Cosby)
 "For Once in My Life" (Miller, Murden)
 "Superstition" 
 "Sir Duke" 
 "Don't You Worry 'bout a Thing" 
 "A Place in the Sun" (Miller, Wells)
 "Fingertips" (Paul, Cosby)
  
2. "Stars On" Jingle (Eggermont, Duiser) - 0:07

3. "It's Not A Wonder, It's A Miracle" (Eggermont, Duiser) - 6:54 
For the US album, this track is titled "Stars On Get Ready III"

4. "Stars On" Jingle (Eggermont, Duiser) - 0:07

Personnel
 Peter Vermeij  - vocals ("Mick Jagger") 
 Tony Sherman - vocals ("Stevie Wonder")
 Jody Pijper - vocals

Production
 Jaap Eggermont - record producer

References

Sources and external links
 
 
 Rateyourmusic.com biography and discography
 Dutch biography and discography
 [ Billboard.com biography and chart history]
 Official Charts, UK chart history
 Dutch chart history

1982 albums
Stars on 45 albums